James Green Douglas (11 July 1887 – 16 September 1954) was an Irish businessman and politician. In 1922 Douglas served as the first-ever Leas-Chathaoirleach (deputy chairperson) of Seanad Éireann, the upper house of the newly independent Irish parliament. Douglas would go on to serve in the Senead for 30 years.

Family
He was the eldest of nine children of John Douglas (1861–1931), originally of Grange, County Tyrone, and his wife, Emily (1864–1933), daughter of John and Mary Mitton of Gortin, Coalisland, County Tyrone. The genealogy of the Douglas family to which he belonged can be traced to Samuel Douglas of Coolhill, Killyman, County Tyrone.

On 14 February 1911, Douglas married Georgina (Ena) Culley (1883–1959), originally of Tirsogue, Lurgan, County Armagh. Their children were John Harold Douglas, who replaced his father as senator, and James Arthur Douglas (1915–1990).

Political career
Douglas was an Irish nationalist Quaker who managed the Irish White Cross from 1920 to 1922. He was appointed by Michael Collins as chairman of the committee to draft the Constitution of the Irish Free State following the Irish War of Independence.

Douglas went on to become a very active member of Seanad Éireann between 1922 and 1936 under the constitution he had helped to prepare. In 1922 he was elected as the first Vice-Chairman of the Senate. The Senate was abolished in 1936 and re-established under the terms of the 1937 Constitution; he was again an active Senator between 1938 and 1943, and from 1944 to 1954. The topics most associated with him during his work as Senator were international refugees and the League of Nations.

References

Sources
 Century of Endeavour – Senator James G Douglas short biography by Roy Johnston, 1999.
 Memoirs of Senator James G. Douglas – Concerned Citizen 

1887 births
1954 deaths
People of the Irish War of Independence
People of the Irish Civil War (Pro-Treaty side)
Independent members of Seanad Éireann
Members of the 1922 Seanad
Members of the 1925 Seanad
Members of the 1928 Seanad
Members of the 1931 Seanad
Members of the 1934 Seanad
Members of the 2nd Seanad
Members of the 3rd Seanad
Members of the 5th Seanad
Members of the 6th Seanad
Members of the 7th Seanad
Members of the 8th Seanad
Irish Quakers
Protestant Irish nationalists
Nominated members of Seanad Éireann